Nicastro (new castle) is a small town in the province of Catanzaro,  in the Calabria region of southern Italy.

Since 1968 it constitutes, together with Sambiase and Sant'Eufemia Lamezia, the city of Lamezia Terme.

Geography 
It is situated on the  isthmus between the gulfs of  Sant'Eufemia and of Squillace, the narrowest part of the entire Italian peninsula. At 216 meters above sea-level, it commands a fine view.

History 
Nicastro's origins trace back to the 9th century, when Calabria was part of the Byzantine Empire, when a fortress called Neo Castrum ("New Castle") was created. The centre was founded during the time of Saracen raids (IX-Xcentury), pushing coastal inhabitants to move to surrounding higher fortified ground.

However, many finds dating back to the Neolithic age and from the Magna Graecia era (IV century BC) have emerged.

In 1057, the area was conquered by the Normans, but Nicastro revolted against Robert Guiscard and his brother  Roger. Having dominated the revolt, the new nobiliary had the Castle built, which was restored in the XIII century by  Frederick II of Swabia in the XIII century. The castle of Nicastro served as the place of imprisonment of Frederick II's son Henry.

Giovanni Antonio Facchinetti, who was briefly Innocent IX, was the bishop of Nicastro from 1560 to 1572.

The area suffered greatly in the earthquakes of 1638, which destroyed the cathedral and the Benedictine abbey of St. Euphemia, founded by Robert Guiscard. Valuable archives were lost in the ruins.

Until the 18th century, in Nicastro and its surroundings sericulture was a very widespread and prosperous activity, so much so that five thousand pounds of raw silk were produced every year.
According to the historian Giuseppe Maria Galanti, at the end of the 18th century, sericulture alongside the cultivation of mulberry trees for the breeding of silkworms were still practiced, however there was a decline in the production.

Economy 
The commerce of the port of Nicastro consists of the exportation of acid, herbs, and wine.

See also 

 Lamezia Terme Town Library
 Ardo Perri

Notes and references 

 Lameziastorica.it History of Lamezia Terme Nicastro
 Article from the Catholic Encyclopedia

Nicastro
Frazioni of the Province of Catanzaro
Former municipalities of Calabria